is a Japanese television drama series that aired on TBS in 1986.

Cast
 Yasuko Sawaguchi
 Kazuki Kosakai
 Shingo Tsurumi
 Satomi Kobayashi
 Kazumi Kawai
 Masumi Miyazaki

References

1986 Japanese television series debuts
1986 Japanese television series endings
TBS Television (Japan) dramas